Hoot is an unincorporated community in Bowie County, Texas, United States.

References

Unincorporated communities in Bowie County, Texas
Unincorporated communities in Texas